This is a list of buildings and structures built for World's Fairs.

Officially recognized exhibitions 
Architecture built for world's fairs recognized by the Bureau International des Expositions.

London Great Exhibition 1851 

 The Crystal Palace

Paris Exposition Universelle 1855 

 Palais de l'Industrie
 Théâtre du Rond-Point

London International Exhibition 1862 

 The Exhibition Building of 1862

Paris Exposition Universelle 1867 

 Palais du Champ de Mars

Vienna World's Fair 1873 

 Rotunda

Philadelphia Centennial Exposition 1876 

 Main Exhibition Building

Paris Exposition Universelle 1878 

 Palais du Trocadéro

Melbourne International Exhibition 1880 

 Royal Exhibition Building

Barcelona Universal Exposition 1888 

 Parc de la Ciutadella

Paris Exposition Universelle 1889 

 Eiffel Tower
 Galerie des machines

Chicago World's Columbian Exposition 1893 

 White City

Brussels International Exposition 1897 

 Palace of the Colonies

Paris Exposition Universelle 1900 

 Grand Palais
 Petit Palais

Liège International 1905 

 Palais des beaux-arts de Liège

San Francisco Panama–Pacific International Exposition 1915 

 Tower of Jewels
 Palace of Fine Arts

Barcelona International Exposition 1929 

 Palau Nacional
 Barcelona Pavilion
 Estadi Olímpic Lluís Companys
 Poble Espanyol
 Teatre Grec
 Magic Fountain of Montjuïc

Paris Exposition Internationale des Arts et Techniques dans la Vie Moderne 1937 

 Palais de Chaillot

New York World's Fair 1939 

 Trylon and Perisphere

Brussels Expo 58 

 Atomium
 Philips Pavilion

Seattle Century 21 Exposition 1962 

 Seattle Center
 Seattle Center Monorail
 Space Needle

Montreal Expo 67 

 Expo 67 pavilions
 Habitat 67

San Antonio HemisFair '68 

 Tower of the Americas

Others

Porto International Exhibition 1867 

 Palácio de Cristal

Sydney International Exhibition 1879 

 Garden Palace

Adelaide Jubilee International Exhibition 1887 

 Jubilee Exhibition Building

Hanoi Exhibition 1902 

 Grand Palais

Colonial Exhibition of Semarang 1914
 Aceh Museum

Paris Colonial Exposition 1931 

 Palais de la Porte Dorée
 Pagode de Vincennes

Glasgow Empire Exhibition 1938 

 Tait Tower

New York World's Fair 1964 

 Unisphere

References 

 
Architecture
World's Fair
Architecture